The ISU Junior Grand Prix (JGP) in Uzbekistan is an international figure skating competition. Sanctioned by the International Skating Union, it is held in the autumn of some years as part of the JGP series. Medals may be awarded in the disciplines of men's singles, ladies' singles, pair skating, and ice dance. The inaugural event was scheduled to be part of the 2020–21 ISU Junior Grand Prix, which was eventually cancelled.

Junior medalists

Men

Ladies

Pairs

Ice dance

References

External links 
 ISU Junior Grand Prix at the International Skating Union

Uzbekistan